Jean Simon (born 21 August 1936) is a Belgian racing cyclist. He rode in the 1963 Tour de France.

References

External links
 

1936 births
Living people
Belgian male cyclists
Place of birth missing (living people)